State University of Land Use Planning (Russian: Государственный университет по землеустройству), formerly Moscow State University of Land Management , State University of Farming, is one of the oldest universities in Russia.

History 

The history of the university began on 27 May 1779 when a Decree of the Governing Senate established a land survey school. The school was founded by Sergey Ivanovich Rozhnov. In 1819, the land survey school was renamed the Konstantinovoye Land Survey School, and in 1835 it was renamed again as the Constantine Land Institute. In 1849 the Konstantinovsky land surveying institute received the right of a first-rate university and was transferred to the position of a military institution that existed before 1867. During the period from 1835 to 1917, the Institute trained more than 2,000 specialists, including approximately 1,500 surveying engineers. In 1945 the Moscow Land Management Institute was renamed the Moscow Institute of Land Use Engineers (MIIS). The Presidium of the Supreme Soviet of the USSR for the merits in the training of highly qualified personnel for agriculture, a significant contribution to the development of science and practice of land management and in connection with the 200th anniversary of the founding of the Moscow Institute of Land Use Engineers was awarded the Order of the Red Banner of Labour. In accordance with the Resolution of the Council of Ministers of the RSFSR of 18 January 1991, No. 30 "On the Republican Program for Land Reform in the Territory of the RSFSR" and Order No. 193 of 24 March 1992 on the Ministry of Agriculture of the Russian Federation, University for Land Management with the training of specialists in land law, land management, soil science, geobotany, geodesy, architecture and planning of villages.

Structure 
Faculty of Architectural
Faculty of Urban Cadastre
Faculty of Land Management
Faculty of Real Estate Cadastre
Faculty of Legal
Institute for Advanced Studies
Military Department

Museum 

The museum is located in the building of the State Unitary Enterprise, built in 1930–1935. Until 1935. The hospital was located in the palace of NI Demidov. (Architect M.Kazakov) – Gorokhovyi per., 4 (from 1873 to 1935gg.) From 1835 to 1873, State University of Farming was located in the palace of Prince Kurakin.

References

External links 
 Official website

Universities in Moscow
Agricultural universities and colleges in Russia